Gail E. Haley (born November 4, 1939) is an American writer and illustrator. She has won the annual awards for children's book illustration from both the American and British librarians, for two different picture books.
She won the 1971 Caldecott Medal for A Story a Story (Atheneum Books, 1970), which she retold from an African folktale,
and the 1976 Kate Greenaway Medal for The Post Office Cat, her own historical fiction about a London post office.

Biography
Haley was born Gail Einhart in Charlotte, North Carolina. At The Charlotte Observer where her father was art director, she later recalled, "In the art department and pressrooms I soaked up the exciting smells and sounds of the graphic arts. I've had printer's ink and rubber cement in my veins ever since." She studied at Richmond Professional Institute and the University of Virginia (graphics and painting).

She married mathematician Joseph A. Haley in 1959. Her debut book both as writer and as illustrator was My Kingdom for a Dragon, published in 1962 by Crozet Print Shop of Crozet, Virginia. It was printed from wood and linoleum blocks in a limited edition of 1000 that she helped bind and sell.
After a divorce she married Arnold Arnold in 1966 and they lived in England from 1973 to 1980. The Post Office Cat, which is set in a British post office, was published in 1976 both by Scribner in America and The Bodley Head in Britain.
She was eligible to win the British Greenaway Medal as a resident.

There are at least two Gail E. Haley archives ("Papers").

As of 1999, Haley and her husband David Considine were Media Literacy consultants and co-authors.

For at least three decades Haley has "presented workshops, story telling, art demonstrations and puppetry programs in schools and libraries throughout the USA, Canada, England and Australia."

Selected works

Novels

 Madwomen of Meriweather (Still in galley form searching for a publisher, 2015; written and illustrated by Gail E. Haley - Inspiration from the story comes from the records of a North Carolina insane asylum in the 1920s.

Fiction

 : My kingdom for a dragon (Crozet Print Shop, 1962); written and illus. by Haley
 : One, two, buckle my shoe (Doubleday, 1964); traditional, illus. by Haley
 : A story, a story (Atheneum, 1970, PZ8.1.H139 St); an African tale, retold and illus. by Haley
 : Altogether, one at a time (Atheneum, 1971); by E. L. Konigsburg, illus. by Haley and others
 : The post office cat (Scribner, c1976); written and illus. by Haley 
 : The green man (c1979; 1st American ed. Scribner, 1980); written and illus. by Haley —based on English legends of the Green Man
 : Mountain Jack tales (Dutton, c1992); as told and illus. by Haley —"These stories featuring the hero Jack are set in the mountains of North Carolina, but have their roots in Old World folklore. The illustrations are wood engravings." (LCC summary)
 Isabella Propeller and the Magic Beanie (Parkway Publishing, c2011); written by Jonathan Graves and illustrated by Gail E. Haley

Nonfiction

Professional education
 : Visual Messages: Integrating imagery into instruction, David M. Considine and Gail E. Haley, Englewood, Colo. : Teacher Ideas Press, 1992, 
 : Imagine That: Developing critical thinking and critical viewing through children’s literature, David M. Considine, Gail E. Haley, Lyn Ellen Lacy, Englewood, Colo. : Teacher Ideas Press, 1994, 

Juvenile
 LCC record: Costumes for plays and playing (Methuen, 1978) —"A guide to making costumes for plays, Halloween, parties, or make-believe with instructions for many types of accessories, ideas for finding and remaking old clothes, and tips on getting into character." (LCC summary)

Film
 "Printmaking techniques in book illustration". Filmstrip, sound cassette, and guide. Weston Woods Studios. 1977(?).
 "Wood and linoleum illustration". 17-minute filmstrip, sound cassette, and guide. Weston Woods Studios. 1978.

Notes

References

 : Library of Congress Online Catalog. Name Heading: Haley, Gail E.

External links

 
 Haley Papers J. Murrey Atkins Library, UNC Charlotte

 

American children's writers
American women illustrators
American children's book illustrators
Caldecott Medal winners
Kate Greenaway Medal winners
Writers who illustrated their own writing
1939 births
Living people
People from Charlotte, North Carolina
21st-century American women